Eupeodes, the Aphideater flies,  is a genus of moderate hoverflies in the family Syrphidae. They are distributed worldwide. They are black with yellow markings and can be easily confused with other genera in the syrphini tribe . The adults feed on nectar and pollen the sources of energy and protein respectively. Larvae feed on wide variety of aphids.

Diagnostic
For terminology see Speight key to genera and glossary
Length 

The eyes  have either no hairs, or rarely very short and sparse pile. The face is usually yellow, with a narrow but distinct brown median stripe. The scutum is usually shining black, but rarely slightly yellow pruinose laterally. The scutellum is dull yellow, translucent. The ventral scutellar fringe is complete and moderately dense. The pleura are black or grayish black, never yellow, usually shining or with very sparse subshining pruinosity on the upper half. The anterior anepisternum, meron, and metepisternum are all bare. The abdomen is oval, usually nearly flat above, with a strong margin from near the middle of tergite 2 to the apex of tergite 5. Tergite 2 typically has a pair of yellow spots, while the other tergites usually have pale yellow to reddish yellow spots commonly lunulate or with bands of similar colour almost straight. The vein R4+5 is nearly straight or slightly but distinctly dipped into cell r4+5. The wing membrane is usually nearly entirely trichose, with only small bare areas near the base (syrphus has tufts of pile on caypters). The legs are slender, and the hind femur is unarmed. The hind coxa does not have hairs at the posteromedial apical angle.

Species

Eupeodes aberrantis (Curran , 1925) 
Eupeodes abiskoensis (Dušek & Láska, 1973) 
Eupeodes aino (Matsumura, 1918)
Eupeodes alaceris (He & Li, 1998)
Eupeodes americanus (Wiedemann , 1830)
Eupeodes angustus (He, 1992)
 Eupeodes (Metasyrphus) asiaticus (Peck, 1972)
Eupeodes aurosus (He, 1993)
Eupeodes beppuensis (Matsumura, 1918)
Eupeodes biciki (Nielsen, 2003)
Eupeodes borealis (Dušek & Láska, 1973) 
Eupeodes bucculatus (Rondani, 1857)
Eupeodes chengi (He, 1992)
Eupeodes cheni (He, 1993)
Eupeodes confertus (Fluke, 1952) 
Eupeodes (Macrosyrphus) confrater (Wiedemann , 1830)
Eupeodes corollae (Fabricius , 1794)
Eupeodes curtus (Hine, 1922)
Eupeodes diminutus (Matsumura, 1918)
Eupeodes duseki (Mazanek, Láska & Bicík, 1999)
Eupeodes eosus (He, 1992)
Eupeodes epicharus (He, 1992)
Eupeodes erasmus (He, 1992)
Eupeodes fallax (Matsumura, 1918)
Eupeodes flaviceps (Rondani, 1857)
Eupeodes (Metasyrphus) flavofasciatus (Ho, 1987)
Eupeodes flukei (Jones, 1917)
Eupeodes (Metasyrphus) frequens (Matsumura, 1917)
Eupeodes fumipennis (Thomson, 1869)
Eupeodes gentneri (fluke, 1952) 
Eupeodes goeldlini (Mazanek, Láska & Bicík, 1999)
Eupeodes hakiensis (Matsumura, 1917)
Eupeodes harbinensis (He, 1992)
Eupeodes (Macrosyrphus) horishanus (Matsumura, 1917)
Eupeodes indistinctus (Matsumura, 1918)
Eupeodes ishiyamensis (Matsumura, 1918)
Eupeodes isshikii (Matsumura, 1918)
Eupeodes karafutonis (Matsumura, 1917)
Eupeodes kawaguchii (Matsumura, 1917)
Eupeodes (Metasyrphus) kirgizorum (Peck, 1969)
Eupeodes (Metasyrphus) klapperichi (Dušek & Láska, 1980)
Eupeodes kuroiwae (Matsumura, 1917)
Eupeodes lambecki (Dušek & Láska, 1973) 
Eupeodes lapponicus (Zetterstedt , 1838)
Eupeodes latifasciatus (Macquart , 1829)
Eupeodes latilunulatus (Collin, 1931)
Eupeodes (Metasyrphus) latimacula (Peck, 1969)
Eupeodes lepidi (He & Li, 1998) 
Eupeodes liaoensis (Huo, 2020)
Eupeodes lucasi (Marcos-García & Láska, 1983)
Eupeodes lundbecki (Soot-Ryen, 1946)
Eupeodes luniger (Meigen , 1822)
Eupeodes medius (Matsumura, 1918)
Eupeodes misomapensis (Matsumura, 1918)
Eupeodes montanus (Curran , 1925) 
Eupeodes montivagus (Snow , 1895)
Eupeodes (Metasyrphus) nakajimensis (Matsumura, 1918)
Eupeodes neoperplexus (Curran , 1925) 
Eupeodes nielseni (Dušek & Láska, 1976) 
Eupeodes nigroventris (Fluke, 1933)
Eupeodes nitens (Zetterstedt , 1843)
Eupeodes noboritoensis (Ninomiya)
Eupeodes nuba (Wiedemann , 1830)
Eupeodes ohmi (Kassebeer, 2000)
Eupeodes (Macrosyrphus) okinawensis (Matsumura, 1916)
Eupeodes parvus (He, 1990)
Eupeodes perplexus (Osburn, 1910)
Eupeodes pingreensis (Fluke, 1930)
Eupeodes pomus (Curran , 1921)
Eupeodes punctifer (Frey, 1934)
Eupeodes punctifer (Kanervo, 1934)
Eupeodes qingchenshanensis (He, 1990)
Eupeodes riukiuensis (Matsumura, 1918)
Eupeodes rojasi (Marnef, 1999)
Eupeodes rufipunctatus (Curran , 1925) 
Eupeodes sculleni (Fluke, 1952) 
Eupeodes shirakii (Matsumura, 1918)
Eupeodes silvaticus (He, 1993)
Eupeodes simillicorollae (Huo, Ren & Zheng, 2007)
 Eupeodes (Metasyrphus) sinuatus (Ho, 1987)
Eupeodes (Metasyrphus) snowi (Wehr, 1924)
Eupeodes spurius (Matsumura, 1918)
Eupeodes (Metasyrphus) stackelbergi (Dušek & Láska, 1980)
Eupeodes stenopus (Matsumura, 1917)
Eupeodes subsimus (Fluke, 1952) 
Eupeodes (Metasyrphus) taeniatus (Ho, 1987)
Eupeodes talus (Fluke, 1933)
Eupeodes tirolensis (Dušek & Láska, 1973) 
Eupeodes (Metasyrphus) tjanshanicus (Peck, 1966)
Eupeodes (Metasyrphus) tshatkalensis (Peck, 1972)
Eupeodes vandergooti (Dušek & Láska, 1973) 
 Eupeodes (Metasyrphus) verruciventris (Peck, 1966)

References

Syrphini
Hoverfly genera
Taxa named by Carl Robert Osten-Sacken